V. K. Hymavathy popularly known as Kalamandalam Hymavathy is a Mohiniyattam dancer and dance teacher from Kerala, India. She received several awards including Sangeet Natak Akademi Award, Kerala Sangeetha Nataka Akademi Gurupooja Award and Kerala Sangeetha Nataka Akademi Award.

Biography
V. K. Hymavathy was born on October 12, 1955, to Krishna Warrier of Peringode, Thrissur and Parvathy Warrier of Machad. Her father was a physician. Her family moved to Cheruthuruthi when she was one year old. At the age of five, she started learning dance under Chandrika, and Kathakali under Sankaranarayanan Asan. She performed dance in Kerala Kalamandalam at the age of 12, with her sister Rugmini. Later, she joined Kalamandalam to study dance, under Kalamandalam Satyabhama, Leelamani and Chandrika and completed her diploma course at the age of 16.

After marriage, at the age of 19 she moved to Calcutta but returned soon to Kerala when she got a job as Mohiniyattam teacher in Kalamandalam. While working at Kalamandalam, Hymavathy studied Kuchipudi under Kalamandalam Kshemavathy. After 33 years of service, she retired from Kalamandalam as Head of the Department of Mohiniyattam, and later joined Kalady Sanskrit University as a Visiting Professor.

Personallife
She and her husband Chandrasekharan have one son. They lives in their house Srikrishnasadanam in Cheruthuruthy, Thrissur district.

Notable performances
Under the guidance of Hymavathy, Daivadasakam, written by Narayana Guru was visualized in the form of Mohiniyattam by 1500 dancers.

Works on her
Mohanam and Cholkettu are two documentaries made about Hymavathy and her dance career.

Awards and honours
Sangeet Natak Akademi Award
Kerala Sangeetha Nataka Akademi Gurupooja Award 2007
Kerala Sangeetha Nataka Akademi Award 2016
Kaladarpanam Award
Lasyamohini Award from Kerala Kalamandalam

References

1955 births
Indian female classical dancers
Performers of Indian classical dance
Mohiniyattam exponents
Living people
Dancers from Kerala
Women artists from Kerala
20th-century Indian dancers
20th-century Indian women artists
People from Thrissur district
Recipients of the Sangeet Natak Akademi Award
Recipients of the Kerala Sangeetha Nataka Akademi Award